Squarepusher Plays... is a 12" vinyl record release by Squarepusher. Etching in the runout groove on side B: "I cannot be arsed with toilet humour". "Squarepusher Theme" was originally released on Feed Me Weird Things via Rephlex Records and the other two tracks were released on the Japanese import and 25th anniversary edition of Feed Me Weird Things as bonus tracks.

Track listing
Side A
"Squarepusher Theme" – 6:20
Side B
"Theme From Goodbye Renaldo" – 6:02
"Deep Fried Pizza" – 3:50

References
Discogs entry
Exclaim article

1996 EPs
Squarepusher EPs